The 2019–20 Scottish League Cup Group stage was played from 12–28 July 2019. A total of 40 teams competed in the group stage. The winners of each of the eight groups, as well as the four best runners-up progressed to the second round (last 16) of the 2019–20 Scottish League Cup.

Format
The group stage consisted of eight groups of five teams. The four clubs competing in the UEFA Champions League (Celtic) and Europa League (Rangers, Kilmarnock, and Aberdeen) qualifying rounds were given a bye through to the second round. The 40 teams taking part in the group stage consisted of the other eight teams that competed in the 2018–19 Scottish Premiership, and all of the teams that competed in the 2018–19 Scottish Championship, 2018–19 Scottish League One and 2018–19 Scottish League Two, as well as the 2018–19 Highland Football League and the 2018–19 Lowland Football League champions.

The winners of each of the eight groups, as well as the four best runners-up, progressed to the second round (last 16), which will include the four UEFA qualifying clubs. At this stage, the competition reverts to the traditional knock-out format. The four group winners with the highest points total and the clubs entering at this stage were seeded, with the four group winners with the lowest points unseeded along with the four best runners-up.

The traditional point system of awarding three points for a win and one point for a draw was used, however, for each group stage match that finished in a draw, a penalty shoot-out took place, with the winner being awarded a bonus point.

The draw for the group stage took place on 28 May 2019 and was broadcast live on the SPFL YouTube channel.

Teams

North

Seeding
Teams in Bold qualified for the second round.

Source:

South

Seeding
Teams in Bold qualified for the second round.

Source:

North
All times are BST (UTC +1).

Group A

Matches

Group B

Matches

Group C

Matches

Group D

Matches

South
All times are BST (UTC +1).

Group E

Matches

Group F

Matches
Due to pitch works at Hampden Park and Broadwood Stadium, Queen's Park played their home games at the Excelsior Stadium in Airdrie and Clyde played one home match at New Douglas Park in Hamilton and one at Ochilview Park, Stenhousemuir.

Group G

Matches

Group H

Matches

Best runners-up

Qualified teams

References

External links
 Scottish Professional Football League – League Cup official website

Scottish League Cup group stages